Ennis Telfair "Rebel" Oakes (December 17, 1883 – March 1, 1948) was an American Major League Baseball player.

Oakes was born in Lisbon, Louisiana. The following year, he was traded to the St. Louis Cardinals along with future Hall of Fame manager Miller Huggins for Fred Beebe. After two seasons as the player-manager for the Pittsburgh Rebels, named in Oakes' honor, the league folded and Rebel never returned to Major League Baseball.

In 986 games over seven major league seasons, Oakes posted a .279 batting average (1011-for-3619) with 428 runs, 112 doubles, 42 triples, 15 home runs, 397 RBI, 163 stolen bases and 265 bases on balls. He finished his career with a .961 fielding percentage as an outfielder.

He died at the age of 64 in Lisbon, Louisiana, and is interred at Rocky Springs Cemetery in Lisbon.

See also
List of Major League Baseball player-managers

References

External links

1883 births
1948 deaths
Major League Baseball player-managers
Major League Baseball center fielders
Cincinnati Reds players
St. Louis Cardinals players
Pittsburgh Rebels players
Cedar Rapids Rabbits players
Springfield Senators players
Providence Grays (minor league) players
Los Angeles Angels (minor league) players
Denver Bears players
Indianapolis Indians players
Jackson Red Sox players
Louisiana Tech Bulldogs baseball players
Baseball players from Louisiana
People from Lisbon, Louisiana